The Centralised Training Institutes of the Indian Railways has eight constituent institutes. The Indian Railways is the largest civilian employer in the world at approximately 1.6 million employees. Around 12000 officers form the line and staff management. Training of all the management cadres is entrusted and shared between these eight institutes.

 Indian Railways Institute of Civil Engineering, Pune, for officers of civil engineering department.
 Indian Railways Institute of Electrical Engineering, Nasik, for officers of electrical engineering department.
  Indian Railways Institute of Financial Management, for officers of Accounts Service.
 Indian Railways Institute of Mechanical and Electrical Engineering, Jamalpur, for officers of mechanical and engineering department.
 Indian Railways Institute of Signal Engineering and Telecommunications, Secunderabad, for officers of S&T department.
 Indian Railways Track Machine Training Center
 National Academy of Indian Railways
 National Rail and Transportation Institute
 Railway Protection Force Academy, Lucknow, for officers of Railway Protection Force.
 Railway Staff College, Vadodara, for all officers and centralised training for officers of accounts, personnel, stores & medical departments.
 Centralized Training Academy of Railways Accounts, Vadodara, and Centralized Training Academy of Railways Accounts, Secunderabad, for financial & managerial training for officers & staff of accounts department.

See also
 Indian Railways organisational structure

External links

 Railway Staff College
 Indian Railway Institute of Civil Engineering
 Indian Railway Institute of Electrical Engineering
 Indian Railway Institute of Mechanical and Electrical Engineering
 Indian Railway Institute of Signal and Telecommunications Engineering
 Indian Railways Institute of Transport Management
 C-TARA (Centralized Training Academy of Railways Accounts)

Training institutes of Indian Railways
Career and technical education
Training organisations in India